Philip Edeipo (born 4 Nov 1986), is a Nigerian footballer, whose last known club was FC Kaisar in Kazakhstan Premier League.

Career

Club
On 9 April 2008, Edeipo signed for Finnish Veikkausliiga club RoPS.

In 2009, Edeipo moved to China, signing for Qingdao Hailifeng. When Qingdao Hailifeng were banned from football for match-fixing scandal in 2010, Edeipo moved to China League One club Shenyang Dongjin in March 2010.

In 2011, he spent 1 month on trials in Turkey until given a contract to Kazakhstan Premier League.

On 1 April 2012, Edeipo suffered a serious knee injury that during Kaisar's week four match against FC Ordabasy.

International
In September 2011, Edeipo expressed his interest in representing Kazakhstan, having previously represented Nigeria at U17 and U23 level.

References

1986 births
Living people
Nigerian footballers
Nigerian expatriate footballers
Rovaniemen Palloseura players
Nigerian expatriates in Finland
Shenyang Dongjin players
Expatriate footballers in Finland
Nigerian expatriates in China
Expatriate footballers in China
Expatriate footballers in Kazakhstan
Veikkausliiga players
China League One players
Kazakhstan Premier League players
Association football forwards
Association football midfielders